Mohamed "Momo" M'Changama (born 9 June 1987) is a professional footballer who plays as a forward for Racing Besançon and the Comoros national team. Previously, he has played with amateur clubs Aubagne and Gardanne and professional club Nîmes.

Club career

Early career
M'Changama was born in the city of Marseille to Comorian parents and developed an interest in football at a young age alongside his younger brother Youssouf. The elder M'Changama struggled to make the grade among clubs situated around the south of France and, ultimately, considered giving the sport up. On the other hand, M'Changama's younger brother Youssouf drew interest from several professional clubs and eventually signed a youth contract with Sedan. He later joined Troyes. With M'Changama's impending future looking bleak, he decided to focus more on his studies.

In 2007, M'Changama returned to football joining amateur club Aubagne FC, who were playing in the Division d'Honneur, the sixth level of French football. He spent two seasons at the club and, in 2009, after displaying positive form with the club, secured a move to nearby club Gardanne in the Championnat de France amateur 2. M'Changama played on the club's senior team for the 2009–10 season helping Gardanne finish in a respectable 7th place in its group.

Nîmes
In 2010, M'Changama signed an amateur contract with professional club Nîmes Olympique. He was immediately inserted onto the club's reserve team. In September 2010, he was called up to the senior team by manager Jean-Michel Cavalli. M'Changama made his professional debut on 1 October in a league match against Le Mans appearing as a substitute in a 2–1 defeat. He made his first start a fortnight later in a 0–0 draw with Istres. M'Changama was praised for his contribution in the match against Istres by Cavalli and, subsequently, began training with the senior team on a regular basis. On 19 October, he scored his first professional goal in a 3–1 loss against Évian.

On 11 November, M'Changama scored the game-winning goal against his brother's club Troyes in a 1–0 victory. The goal was notable due in part to the fact that M'Changama was not scheduled to appear in the match. In the week leading up to the match, he was not named to the 16-man squad to appear in the match and was, subsequently, told that he would play in the reserves for the week. On the day of the match, M'Changama performed routine day-to-day activities. While shopping at the mall, he was informed by one of the assistant coaches by phone that he would be needed for the Troyes match due to backup striker Madimoussa Traoré developing an illness during warm-ups. M'Changama appeared on the bench in the match and, later, appeared as a substitute scoring the game-winning goal in the 76th minute.

Later career
M'Changama joined Athlético Marseille in January 2019.

International career
M'Changama made his debut for the Comoros national team on 9 October 2010 in a match against Mozambique.

Career statistics
Scores and results list Comoros' goal tally first, score column indicates score after each M'Changama goal.

References

External links
 
 
 

1987 births
Living people
Footballers from Marseille
Citizens of Comoros through descent
Comorian footballers
French footballers
French sportspeople of Comorian descent
Black French sportspeople
Association football forwards
Comoros international footballers
2021 Africa Cup of Nations players
Nîmes Olympique players
Amiens SC players
Vendée Poiré-sur-Vie Football players
Les Herbiers VF players
FC Annecy players
Athlético Marseille players
FC Istres players
Racing Besançon players
Ligue 2 players
Championnat National players
Championnat National 2 players
Championnat National 3 players
Comorian expatriate footballers
Comorian expatriate sportspeople in France
Expatriate footballers in France